Jessica Pimentel (born September 20, 1982) is an American actress and musician. She is best known for her role as Maria Ruiz on the Netflix original series Orange Is the New Black. She is also the lead singer of the metal band Alekhine's Gun and backing vocalist in the band Brujeria.

Early life 
Pimentel was born in Brooklyn, New York. Both of her parents, originally from La Romana, Dominican Republic, immigrated to New York as teenagers. Pimentel was the couple's only child. Her parents divorced when she was six years old, after which she became estranged from her father.<ref name=":0">{{Cite magazine|url=https://www.rollingstone.com/tv/features/oitnbs-metalhead-inside-jessica-pimentels-double-life-w449586|title=Meet 'OITNBs Secret Metalhead: Inside Jessica Pimentel's Double Life|magazine=Rolling Stone|access-date=2017-06-30|archive-date=September 7, 2017|archive-url=https://web.archive.org/web/20170907193313/http://www.rollingstone.com/tv/features/oitnbs-metalhead-inside-jessica-pimentels-double-life-w449586|url-status=dead}}</ref>

Pimentel graduated from New York's Fiorello H. LaGuardia High School of Music & Art and Performing Arts, where she played violin. She focused on acting more after high school, playing Juliet in a touring production of Romeo and Juliet, and landing small roles in movies and TV shows.

 Acting career 
After a series of bit parts, Pimentel played the role of Angelique Domenguez in the 2008 film Pride and Glory. In 2014, she was cast as Floyd in four episodes of Person of Interest.

Pimentel's breakout role came in 2013, when she was cast as Maria Ruiz on the Netflix comedy-drama Orange Is the New Black''. Pimentel was credited as a guest star for the first four seasons, before finally being made a part of the regular cast for Season 5.

Music career 
Pimentel began playing music at the age of two and trained as classical violinist and concert master who has played at Carnegie hall. In her teens she began learning the guitar, electric bass, percussion and keyboards and joined several New York Hardcore bands. She was the bassist for New York heavy metal and hardcore band Desolate from 2010 to 2014.

Since 2010, Pimentel has been the lead vocalist and a recording guitarist for the New York-based death metal band Alekhine's Gun. Pimentel has also recorded several songs with the band Black Heart Sutra, and sings in the Los Angeles and Tijuana-based metal band Brujeria, performing under the name La Bruja Encabronada.

Pimentel is a featured artist for Spector basses, Halo guitars, and Krank Amps.

Personal life 
Pimentel has been dating Meshuggah drummer Tomas Haake since 2013 and lives with him in Sweden.

Pimentel was raised Christian, but became a practicing Buddhist as an adult.

Filmography

Films

Television

References

External links 
 

1982 births
21st-century American actresses
Actresses from New York (state)
Hispanic and Latino American women singers
American expatriates in Sweden
American singers of Dominican Republic descent
American television actresses
American women heavy metal singers
Hispanic and Latino American actresses
Living people
21st-century American singers
21st-century American women singers